Pakistan Standard Time (abbreviated as PKT) is UTC+05:00 hours ahead of Coordinated Universal Time. The time zone is in use during standard time in Asia.

History

Pakistan had been following UTC+05:30 since 1907 (during the British Raj) and continued using it after independence in 1947. On 15 September 1951, following the findings of mathematician Mahmood Anwar, two time zones were introduced. Karachi Time (KART) was introduced in West Pakistan by adjusting 30 minutes off UTC+05:30 to UTC+05:00, while Dacca Time (DACT) was introduced in East Pakistan by subtracting 30 minutes off UTC+06:30 to UTC+06:00. The changes were made effective on 30, September 1951. PKT is measured in Gilgit, near the village of Naltar. In 1971, Karachi Time was renamed to Pakistan Standard Time.

Daylight saving time

Daylight saving time is no longer observed in Pakistan.

See also
UTC+05:00
Time in Pakistan
Karachi Time
Yekaterinburg Time

References

Time in Pakistan
Time zones